Ishaq Musaad was Bishop of Egypt   from 1974
to 1982.

He studied for the priesthood at St Aidan's College, Birkenhead and was ordained in 1954. After a  curacy in Old Cairo he was Curate in charge at Giza until 1961. He was the Chaplain at Heliopolis from then until 1972 when he became Archdeacon in Egypt.

References

Alumni of St Aidans College Birkenhead
Anglican archdeacons in Africa
Anglican bishops of Egypt
20th-century Anglican bishops in Africa
Egyptian expatriates in the United Kingdom